Yegor Bulychyov and Others is a 1971 Soviet drama film directed by Sergey Solovyov.

Plot 
The film tells about a large Russian timber merchant Yegor Bulychov, who is experiencing an internal conflict and a conflict with the surrounding unfair world.

Cast 
 Mikhail Ulyanov as Yegor Bulychov
 Maya Bulgakova as Kseniya, Bulychov's wife
 Yekaterina Vasilyeva as Aleksandra
 Zinaida Slavina as Varvara
 Anatoli  Romashin as Zvontsov
 Yevgeny Steblov as Tyatin
 Valentina Sharykina as Elizaveta
 Rimma Markova as Abbess Melanya, wife's sister
 Nina Ruslanova as Glafira 
 Yefim Kopelyan as Vasily Dostigaev
 Georgy Burkov as Alexey  Dostygaev
 Yuriy  Nazarov as Yakov Laptev, Bulychov's godson
 Vladimir Yemelyanov as Mokei Petrovich Bashkin 
 Lev Durov as trumpeter Gavrila
 Vyacheslav Tikhonov as  priest Pavlin
 Ivan Lapikov as Fool-for-Christ

References

External links 
 

1971 films
1970s Russian-language films
Soviet adventure films
Soviet drama films
1970s adventure films
1971 drama films
Films directed by Sergei Solovyov
Mosfilm films
Films based on works by Maxim Gorky
1971 directorial debut films
Films set in 1917